Night Shift at the Thrill Factory is the second album by the Berkeley, California punk rock band The Mr. T Experience, released in 1988 by Rough Trade Records. Lookout! Records re-released the album in 1996 with a number of bonus tracks.

The album continued the band's pop punk style, with some more intellectual elements beginning to appear. Songs like "Velveeta" and "The History of the Concept of the Soul" became standards in the band's live set for several years following, the latter essentially being band leader Dr. Frank's college thesis condensed into an 80-second song. The song "Now We Are Twenty-One" was featured in a scene in the 1996 movie Glory Daze starring Ben Affleck, in which the main characters perform a cover of the song as the house band at their party. The film's soundtrack also includes two of the band's mid-1990s songs, "I Just Wanna Do it With You" and "Even Hitler Had a Girlfriend."

The song "I Ain't Gonna Be History," included on the 1996 CD re-release of the album, is an outtake from the original album sessions. The other bonus songs are from an 8-track demo tape recorded by Greg Freeman at Lowdown Studios in July 1988. The song "Boredom Zone" originally appeared on the compilation The Thing That Ate Floyd, which also featured many of the band's contemporaries in the late-1980s San Francisco Bay Area punk movement.

Track listing

Personnel
Dr. Frank - vocals, guitar
Jon Von Zelowitz - vocals, guitar
Byron Stamatatos - bass
Alex Laipeneiks - drums

Album information
Produced by Kent Steedman
CD re-release remixed by Kevin Army, Dr. Frank, and Jon Von Zelowitz at Hyde Street Studio D.
Mastered by George Horn at Fantasy Studios in Berkeley, California
Layout based on original concept by Christopher Applegren
Disc and inlay drawing by Sergie
Front cover photo by Michael Llewelyn

The Mr. T Experience albums
1988 albums